HD 125628 is a binary star system in the constellation Centaurus. It is faintly visible to the naked eye with a combined apparent visual magnitude of 4.76. The distance to this system is approximately 380 light years based on parallax. It is drifting further away from the Sun with a radial velocity of +15 km/s. The absolute magnitude is −0.55.

The primary component of this system, component A, is an aging giant star with a stellar classification of G9III and a visual magnitude of 5.09. It is an F-type main-sequence star with a class of F5V.

References

G-type giants
F-type main-sequence stars
Binary stars
Centaurus (constellation)
Durchmusterung objects
Centauri, 340
125628
070264
5371